Constantine Giannaris, also Constantinos Giannaris (born 1959), is a Greek film director, photographer, actor and author. He is best known for his award-winning feature films “From the Edge of the City,” “Hostage,” and his early queer work in Britain.

Filmography

References

External links
 

1959 births
Living people
Greek film directors
Greek screenwriters
Film people from Athens